Stupnik is a municipality in Croatia in the Zagreb County. According to the 2011 census, there are 3,251 inhabitants, 95% of whom are Croats.

References

Populated places in Zagreb County
Municipalities of Croatia